Koit Annamaa (16 September 1912 – 1 November 1970) was an Estonian athlete. He competed in the men's hammer throw at the 1936 Summer Olympics.

References

External links
 

1912 births
1970 deaths
Sportspeople from Tartu
People from Kreis Dorpat
Athletes (track and field) at the 1936 Summer Olympics
Estonian male hammer throwers
Olympic athletes of Estonia
Burials at Rahumäe Cemetery
20th-century Estonian people